Nawwaf Moussawi (born 3 April 1965) is a Shia Lebanese member of parliament representing the Sour district. He is part of Hezbollah's bloc.

Controversies 

In February 2019, Moussawi was suspended from the political activities within his party, due to his violation of a Hezbollah policy of avoiding arguments with rival politicians. The one-year suspension came after his spat with Samy Gemayel and Nadim Gemayel regarding the legitimacy of President Michel Aoun who managed, according to Moussawi, to reach his position under "the rifle of the resistance" but "not on an Israeli tank"; in reference to President Bachir Gemayel.

In July 2019, his daughter, Ghadir, was chased by her ex-husband on a highway, which raises concerns regarding Lebanese women's rights issues.

See also
 Lebanese Parliament
 Members of the 2009-2013 Lebanese Parliament
 Hezbollah

References

External links
Former Hizbullah MP Nawaf Mousawi: Soleimani Played A Significant Role In Organizing Afghan Resistance To U.S. Occupation; Israel Will Not Last A Day Without U.S. Support, Jan 03, 2023

1965 births
Living people
Members of the Parliament of Lebanon
Lebanese Shia Muslims
Hezbollah politicians
Beirut Arab University alumni